Invitation is an album by vibraphonist Milt Jackson's Sextet featuring performances recorded in 1962 and released on the Riverside label.

Reception
The Allmusic review by Scott Yanow awarded the album 3½ stars stating it has "enough variety to hold one's interest throughout. It's not essential but Milt Jackson fans will enjoy this music".

Track listing
All compositions by Milt Jackson except as indicated
 "Invitation" (Bronislaw Kaper, Paul Francis Webster) - 3:55 
 "Too Close for Comfort" (Jerry Bock, Larry Holofcener, George David Weiss) - 5:15 
 "Ruby, My Dear" [Take 6] (Thelonious Monk) - 4:27 
 "Ruby, My Dear" [Take 5] (Monk) - 4:15 Bonus track on CD reissue 
 "The Sealer" - 6:32 
 "Poom-A-Loom" - 6:56 
 "Stella by Starlight" (Ned Washington, Victor Young) - 4:00 
 "Ruby" (Monk) - 5:53 
 "None Shall Wander" [Take 8] (Kenny Dorham) - 3:55 
 "None Shall Wander" [Take 6] (Dorham) - 3:56 Bonus track on CD reissue  
Recorded in New York City on June 19 & 20 and July 5, 1962

Personnel
Milt Jackson – vibes
Kenny Dorham, Virgil Jones (tracks 2 & 6) - trumpet
Jimmy Heath - tenor saxophone (tracks 1, 3-5 & 7-10)
Tommy Flanagan - piano
Ron Carter - bass
Connie Kay - drums

References 

Riverside Records albums
Milt Jackson albums
1962 albums
Albums produced by Orrin Keepnews